Eladi  is a former village development committee later merged with  Waling Municipality in 2017, located in Syangja District, Gandaki Province of Western Nepal. At the time of the 2011 Nepal census it had a population of 1765. It is now recognized as ward no 4 of Waling Municipality. Gurung, Brahmin, Chhetri, Magar, Kami, Damai are the major ethnicities residing in this area.

References

2. https://walingmun.gov.np/?language=en

External links
UN map of the municipalities of Syangja District

Populated places in Syangja District